Jolanta the Elusive Pig is a 1945 Swedish comedy film directed by Hugo Bolander, Oscar Winge and starring Winge, Ninni Löfberg and Thor Modéen.

It is a remake of the 1934 German film Trouble with Jolanthe.

Cast
 Oscar Winge as Jeppsson
 Ninni Löfberg as Karin Jeppsson
 Thor Modéen as Police constable
 Fritiof Billquist as Pilgren
 Torsten Lilliecrona as Folke Lindgren
 Harry Persson as Valdemar Månsson
 Carin Swensson as Hanna Jönsson 
 Per Björkman as Svensson
 Algot Larsson as Sören

References

Bibliography 
 Rune Waldekranz. Filmens historia: de första hundra åren från zoopraxiscope till video, Volume 2. Norstedt, 1986.

External links 
 

1945 films
Swedish comedy films
1945 comedy films
1940s Swedish-language films
Remakes of German films
Swedish films based on plays
Swedish black-and-white films
Films directed by Hugo Bolander
1940s Swedish films